Apollonia was an ancient town in the peninsula of Acte, or Mount Athos in Macedonia, the inhabitants of which were called Macrobii. Homer mentions Athos in the Iliad (Rhapsody 219) and, in connection to Mount Athos, Gaius Plinius Secundus (the ancient historian and Roman commander also known as Pliny the Elder), refers to the cities of Ouranoupolis, Palaiotrion, Thysson, Kleonas, and Apollonia.

The site of Apollonia is unknown.

See also
 List of ancient Greek cities

References

Reference to Athos and Pliny the Elder's mention of Apollonia is found in this website: http://www.macedonian-heritage.gr/Athos/General/History.html

Ancient Athos
Greek colonies in Chalcidice
Former populated places in Greece
Populated places in ancient Macedonia
Lost ancient cities and towns